Ayatollah Mohammad al-Yaqoobi (born 9 September 1960) is a prominent Iraqi Twelver Shi'a Marja'. He is the second most widely followed Marja' in Iraq, the most widely followed being Ali al-Sistani. As well as heading the Al-Sadr Religious University in Najaf, he established one of the largest women's Hawzas in Iraq, and oversees many charitable organisations within Iraq. He is an active figure within Iraqi politics, and is considered by the Hawza to be the spiritual successor of Mohammad Mohammad Sadeq al-Sadr and the school of Muhammad Baqir al-Sadr, with the former famously naming Yaqoobi his successor in an audio recording.

Education
Yaqoobi graduated with a BA in Civil Engineering from the University of Baghdad in 1982 and joined the Hawza Najaf in 1988. In Najaf, he studied under various scholars, most notably Ayatollah Abu al-Qasim al-Khoei, under whom he was ordained with his religious turban, and Ayatollah Mohammad Mohammad Sadeq al-Sadr. He maintained a close relationship with Grand Ayatollah Mohammad Mohammad Sadeq al-Sadr, who, amongst others, granted him his  Ijtihad in 1998. Amongst these testimonies is the Ijtihad testimony of Mohammad Sadeqi Tehrani, the well known expert exegete of the Quran and student of Muhammad Husayn Tabatabai who in particular highlights Yaqoobi's expertise in deriving religious law from the Quran.

See also
List of Maraji
Mohammad Baqir al-Sadr
Mohammad Mohammad Sadeq al-Sadr
Mohammad Hussein Fadlallah
Najaf
Hawza

References

External links

1960 births
Living people
People from Najaf
Iraqi grand ayatollahs
Iraqi Islamists
Shia Islamists
University of Baghdad alumni